The Band of the Parachute Regiment is the regimental band of the Parachute Regiment under the Royal Corps of Army Music based at Colchester Garrison, England.

History 
On the 1 August 1942, the Parachute Regiment was formed. The Parachute Regiment did not receive any musical support until 1947 when the band of the 1st and 2nd Battalion was formed in Aldershot, Hampshire.
A year later, the Band of the 3rd Battalion was formed.

In the 1985 Defence Review, the three battalion bands were disbanded and reformed to make up two new larger regimental bands, the Falklands and Pegasus Bands. These bands provided music to the three battalions of the Parachute Regiment and additional airborne units. In 1994, 'Options for Change' resulted in the creation of the Corps of Army Music and subsequently the amalgamation of the Falklands and Pegasus Band to create the Band of the Parachute Regiment under the command of the Director of Music.

See also 
British Army
Military Band

References

External links  
Parachute Regiment
Royal Corps of Army Music

Royal Corps of Army Music